Maxwell Ariston Burgess was a member of the parliament of Bermuda for the United Bermuda Party for the constituency of Hamilton West. He was minister of youth, sport and recreation.

References 

United Bermuda Party politicians
Year of birth missing (living people)
Members of the Parliament of Bermuda
Living people
Place of birth missing (living people)